Bellefontaine is an unincorporated community in Washington County, in the U.S. state of Missouri.

History
A variant name was "Bellefountaine". Bellefontaine took its name from nearby Bellefontaine Lead Mine. The community once had Bellefontaine Schoolhouse, now defunct.

References

Unincorporated communities in Washington County, Missouri
Unincorporated communities in Missouri